Sant'Angelo a Scala is a town and comune in the province of Avellino, Campania, southern Italy. It is an agricultural center surrounded by woods largely composed of chestnut and hazelnut.

References

Cities and towns in Campania